Bishtazhin is a village located near Gjakova, Kosovo. It is inhabited exclusively by Albanians.

History 
Bishtazhin was formed in the 16th century. Saint Teresa's mother is believed to have hailed from Bishtazhin.

Religion 
Bishtazhin is inhabited by Catholic Albanians. The Church of Our Lady of the Rosary is located in the village.

Places of interest 

The Terzi Bridge is nearby.

Notes and references 

Notes:

References:

Villages in Gjakova